The Caribbean Regional Human Resource Development Program for Economic Competitiveness known as (CPEC) for short is a programme funded by the Canadian International Development Agency (CIDA).  The agency is a recent manifestation of historical good-relations and cooperation between the Commonwealth-Caribbean and the nation of Canada.

Affiliated areas
OECS - Tourism, Agriculture, Financial Services and Construction.
Guyana - Agro-processing, Forestry and Wood Products, Other Manufacturing and Tourism
Jamaica - Tourism, Agriculture and Agro-Industry.
Regional - Tourism, Agriculture and Financial Services

External links
Official website - of the CEPC

Economy of the Caribbean
Politics of the Caribbean
Foreign relations of Canada
Organisations based in the Caribbean

sr:CEPC